Geodermatophilus aquaeductus is a Gram-positive, aerobic and gamma-ray resistant bacterium from the genus Geodermatophilus which has been isolated from the surface of a calcarenite stone from the ruins of the Aqueduct of Hadrian in Tunisia.

References

Bacteria described in 2015
Actinomycetia